Hendri Kurniawan Saputra (born 12 May 1981) is an Indonesian-born Singaporean retired badminton player.

Career 
Saputra and his brother, Hendra Wijaya, joined the Singapore Badminton Association (SBA) in 2000 and both became Singapore citizens after five years. He won a silver medal, along with his brother and also partner, Hendra Wijaya, in the men's doubles, and bronze with Li Yujia in the mixed doubles at the 2007 Southeast Asian Games in Bangkok, Thailand.

Saputra represented Singapore at the 2006 Commonwealth Games in Melbourne, Australia, where he competed in the mixed doubles. Playing with Li Yujia, he defeated Kenya's Victor Odera and Irene Kerimah, Canada's Mike Beres and Valerie Loker, and Australia's Travis Denney and Kate Wilson-Smith in the preliminary rounds, before losing out the semi-final match to English pair Nathan Robertson and Gail Emms, with a score of 21–19, 14–21, and 17–21. Despite their semi-final loss, Saputra and Li managed to beat the neighbouring Malaysian duo Koo Kien Keat and Wong Pei Tty for the bronze medal victory, attaining a three-set score of 21–14, 21–23, and 21–6.

Saputra also qualified for the mixed doubles at the 2008 Summer Olympics in Beijing, by placing thirteenth and granting an entry as one of the top 15 seeded teams from the Badminton World Federation's ranking list. Playing with Li Yujia for the second time, Saputra lost the preliminary round match to Danish pair and European champions Thomas Laybourn and Kamilla Rytter Juhl, with a score of 12–21 and 14–21.

At the 2010 Commonwealth Games in Delhi, India, Saputra reunited his partner Hendra Wijaya in the men's doubles. The Singaporean pair defeated Northern Ireland's Matthew Gleave and Tony Stephenson, Isle of Man's Joshua Green and Matthew Wilkinson, and Scotland's Watson Briggs and Paul van Rietvelde in the preliminary rounds, before losing out the semi-final match to Malaysian duo Tan Boon Heong and Koo Kien Keat, with a unanimous score of 11–21 and 8–21. Saputra and Wijaya proceeded to the bronze medal match, where they defeated fellow Singaporean badminton players Derek Wong and Chayut Triyachart for the medal, attaining a score of 23–21 and 21–12. Shortly after his second Commonwealth Games, Saputra and his brother, Hendra Wijaya, announced their resignations from the Singapore national badminton team, citing difficult targets and no positions in the SBA as sparring partners.

References

External links
 
 Profile – Team Singapore
 NBC Olympics Profile

1981 births
Living people
People from Semarang
Sportspeople from Central Java
Indonesian male badminton players
Indonesian emigrants to Singapore
Singaporean male badminton players
Badminton players at the 2008 Summer Olympics
Olympic badminton players of Singapore
Badminton players at the 2006 Commonwealth Games
Badminton players at the 2010 Commonwealth Games
Commonwealth Games bronze medallists for Singapore
Commonwealth Games medallists in badminton
Badminton players at the 2006 Asian Games
Asian Games competitors for Singapore
Competitors at the 2005 Southeast Asian Games
Competitors at the 2007 Southeast Asian Games
Competitors at the 2009 Southeast Asian Games
Southeast Asian Games silver medalists for Singapore
Southeast Asian Games bronze medalists for Singapore
Southeast Asian Games medalists in badminton
Twin sportspeople
Indonesian twins
Medallists at the 2006 Commonwealth Games
Medallists at the 2010 Commonwealth Games